The NRL State Championship is a rugby league match contested by the premiers of the two elite second-tier competitions in Australia, the New South Wales Cup and the Queensland Cup. The match has been played as a curtain-raiser to the NRL Grand Final at Stadium Australia since it was introduced by the National Rugby League (NRL) in 2014. The match acts as a Super Bowl-style game to determine the National Reserve Grade Champions.

History
The origins of the NRL State Championship can be traced back to an idea from the Queensland media during the 1984 Brisbane Rugby League season when two club sides had agreed to play a one-off match. This was when the competitions of the Sydney Rugby League premiership and the Brisbane Rugby League premiership operated independently of each other with the only exception being State of Origin time, when players crossed paths. While the New South Wales media's general consensus was always that Sydney-based NSWRL was the premier and stronger of the two major rugby league competition, all seemed to be set for the one-off match before the NSWRL hierarchy stepped in and put a stop to the proposed match.

The 1984 Brisbane Rugby League Wynnum-Manly Seagulls team was unquestionably Queensland's best, the team defeated a Southern Suburbs Districts Magpies side coached by Wayne Bennett and boasting names such as Gary Belcher, Mal Meninga, Peter Jackson, Bob Lindner in the 1984 Brisbane Rugby League Grand Final by a record 42–8 scoreline. Many supporters north of the border believe they were also better than the 1984 Sydney Rugby League champion team the Canterbury-Bankstown Bulldogs. The Brisbane media were so confident about the strength of this super Wynnum side that they suggested a challenge match between the Seagulls and the Sydney Premiers Canterbury Bankstown.

It was an idea liked by the QRL, but if the suggestion is that the NSWRL were the roadblock, Canterbury prop Peter Tunks said the Bulldogs players and officials were just as keen to make the game happen as their northern rivals. "There was talk in the media about it and we were keen to play it because they obviously had a pretty good side with Wally, Gene Miles, Greg Dowling but we loved playing anybody back in those days", Tunks said. "We knew that it was a decent comp in Brisbane but we obviously didn't think it was as strong as the Sydney comp because this was the be-all and end-all. At Canterbury, we really loved a challenge and we would have loved the opportunity of going up against a team full of great players like they had. It's like anything, to be the best you have to beat the best and that was our attitude but unfortunately it didn't come off. I don't know where we were supposed to play but it would have been good fun."

The NRL State Championship is marketed as "The best New South Wales club versus the best Queensland club". However, in both the New South Wales and Queensland Cups there are or were clubs based outside their respective states:
 New Zealand Warriors based in Auckland, Auckland Region, New Zealand (NSW Cup)*
 Papua New Guinea Hunters based in Port Moresby, Central Province, Papua New Guinea (QLD Cup)
 Tweed Heads Seagulls based in Tweed Heads, New South Wales, Australia (QLD Cup)

 The New Zealand Warriors departed the NSW Cup after the cancelled 2020 season

In 2014 the Northern Queensland Pride representing the Queensland Cup defeated the Penrith Panthers representing the New South Wales Cup in the first NRL State Championship Grand Final. The match has been played every subsequent year, with the exception of 2020 when it was not held on account of both competitions being cancelled due to the effects of the COVID-19 pandemic, and in 2021 with the remainder of the New South Wales Cup being cancelled also due to the COVID-19 lockdown in Sydney.

Results
The match is a curtain-raiser to the final match on NRL Grand Final day, with the winner crowned the NRL State Champions. Between 2014 and 2017 the match was played after the now-defunct NRL Youth Grand Final and before the NRL Grand Final. In 2018 the match was played after the NRL Women's Grand Final and before the NRL Grand Final. Since 2019 it has been played before the NRL Women's Grand Final and the NRL Grand Final. In 2020 the match was not played due to the cancellation of the state premierships after Round 1 caused by the Coronavirus pandemic, and wasn't played in 2021 due the COVID-19 lockdown in Sydney. The match will make a return in 2022.

NRL State Championship winners

State Championship Team Performance/s 

 SCP = State Championships Played
 SCW = State Championships Won
 SCL = State Championships Lost

Media coverage
Live television coverage is broadcast by Australia's Fox Sports and Nine Network (including Nine's regional affiliates NBN Television, WIN Television and IMP Television until 2015 and mid 2016) while live radio coverage is broadcast by Australia's ABC Grandstand around Australia via both the ABC Radio Mobile App (Digital Radio Stadion) and their network of FM and AM Local Radio Stations.

See also

 New South Wales Cup
 Queensland Cup

References

National Rugby League
Rugby league competitions in Australia
Rugby league competitions in New South Wales
Rugby league competitions in Queensland
Recurring sporting events established in 2014
2014 establishments in Australia